Pushkinsky District is the name of several administrative and municipal districts in Russia:
Pushkinsky District, Moscow Oblast, an administrative and municipal district of Moscow Oblast
Pushkinsky District, Saint Petersburg, an administrative city district of the federal city of Saint Petersburg

See also
Pushkinsky (disambiguation)

References